Ploiariolini is a tribe of thread-legged bugs, comprising 16 genera and 142 described species. Ploiariolini has a worldwide distribution.

Partial list of genera
Ademula McAtee & Malloch, 1926
Bironiola Horváth, 1914
Calphurniella Wygodzinsky, 1966
Calphurnioides Distant, 1913
Ctydinna Wygodzinsky, 1966
Diabolicoris Wall & Cassis, 2003
Emesopsis Uhler, 1983
Empicoris Wolff, 1811
Hybomatocoris Wygodzinsky, 1966
Malacopus Stål, 1858
Mesosepis Wygodzinsky, 1966
Nesidiolestes Kirkaldy, 1902
Panamia Kirkaldy, 1907
Saicella Usinger, 1958
Sepimesos Wygodzinsky, 1966
Tridemula Horváth, 1914

References

Reduviidae
Hemiptera tribes
Taxa named by Edward Payson Van Duzee